Rabbi Yitzchok Friedman (1850 – 11 March 1917) was founder and first Rebbe of the Boyan Hasidic dynasty. He was known as the Pachad Yitzchok (Dread of Isaac).

Early life
The Pachad Yitzchok was the eldest son of Rabbi Avrohom Yaakov Friedman (1820–1883), the first Sadigura Rebbe, and his wife Miriam. He was the grandson of Rabbi Yisroel of Ruzhin (1797–1851), founder of the Ruzhiner dynasty.

At the age of 15 he married Malka Twersky, daughter of Rabbi Yochanan Twersky, the Rachmastrivka Rebbe. They had four sons and one daughter.

Founding of Boyaner Hasidism

Upon the death of his father in 1883, Rabbi Yitzchok and his younger brother, Rabbi Yisrael (1852–1907), assumed joint leadership of their father's Hasidim. Although they were content with this arrangement, many of the Sadigura Hasidim preferred to have one Rebbe. As a result, in 1887 the brothers agreed to draw lots to determine who would stay in Sadigura and who would move out. The lots fell to Rabbi Yisrael to remain as the second Sadigerer Rebbe.  So, Rabbi Yitzchak moved to the neighboring town of Boiany (Boyan) and established his court there, becoming the first Boyaner Rebbe.

Under the leadership of the Pachad Yitzchok, Boyaner Hasidism flourished. The town of Boiany became a Hasidic center with a synagogue and four prayer houses. Boyaner communities were established in neighboring towns and in Jerusalem, Tiberias, and Safed. The Rebbe encouraged one of his wealthy Hasidim, Dov Ber Horenstein, who was childless, to build houses in Jerusalem as a memorial for himself.  The neighborhood founded by Dov Ber Horenstein, was formed near what is now known as Geula.

The Boyaner Rebbe was known for his piety and humility. However, he presented a regal face to the public and lived in a palatial home. This dichotomy was emblematic of the Ruzhiner tradition founded by his grandfather, Rabbi Yisroel of Ruzhin. The Rebbe was revered by his Hasidim, and formed close relationships with them. He was also known for his Torah knowledge and his love for the Land of Israel. He inherited the title of nasi (president) of Kolel Vohlin in the Land of Israel from his father.  This gave him the responsibility of coordinating all funds sent for the welfare of the Orthodox community, while living there.

Final years and succession
At the beginning of World War I, the Russian army occupied Boiany.  The Jewish neighborhood was completely destroyed. Therefore, the Boyaner Rebbe and his family fled to Vienna. In 1916, the Rebbe became deathly ill, but recovered and continued his leadership. On 11 March 1917 (17 Adar 5677), he took ill again, which made him call for his wife and children to part from each of them individually.  On his death bed, he began singing a nigun (song) of deveikut (attachment to God). While singing, his soul departed. The Boyaner Rebbe was buried in the Vienna Jewish cemetery in a special ohel. His eldest son, Rabbi Menachem Nachum (1869–1936), was buried in the same ohel after his death.

When the war ended, the Pachad Yitzchok's four sons each moved to a different country to establish their courts. Rabbi Menachem Nachum, his eldest son, became the Boyaner Rebbe in Chernowitz, Bukovina. Afterwards, Rabbi Menachem Nachum's son-in-law, Rabbi Moshenu (1841–1943), became the Boyaner Rebbe in Krakow. Then, the Pachad Yitzchok's second son, Rabbi Yisroel (1878–1951), became the Boyaner Rebbe in Leipzig, Germany. His third son, Rabbi Avrohom Yaakov (1884–1941), became the Boyaner Rebbe in Lemberg. Then, his fourth son, Rabbi Mordechai Shlomo (1891–1971), became the Boyaner Rebbe in New York. After the latter's death, the Boyaner dynasty was without a leader until 1984.  In that year, Rabbi Mordechai Shlomo's grandson, Rabbi Nachum Dov Brayer (born 1959), was crowned Boyaner Rebbe. Since then, Rabbi Nachum Dov Brayer has continued as Boyaner Rebbe.

The dynasty is now headquartered in Jerusalem, Israel, where the Rebbe resides.

References 

1850 births
1917 deaths
19th-century rabbis from the Russian Empire
20th-century Russian rabbis
Austrian Haredi rabbis
Rebbes of Boyan
Rabbis from Vienna
Bukovina Jews
Austro-Hungarian rabbis
Clergy from Chernivtsi